Purnia Assembly constituency is an assembly constituency in Purnia district in the Indian state of Bihar.

Overview
As per Delimitation of Parliamentary and Assembly constituencies Order, 2008, No 62. Purnia Assembly constituency is composed of the following: Purnia East community development block including Purnia Municipal Corporation. In the 2015 Bihar Legislative Assembly election, Purnia was announced to be one of the 36 seats to have VVPAT enabled electronic voting machines.

Purnia Assembly constituency is part of No 12 Purnia (Lok Sabha constituency).

Members of Legislative Assembly

Election results

2020

References

External links
 

Assembly constituencies of Bihar
Politics of Purnia district
Purnia